Kazaklarovo (Qaźaqlar) is a rural locality (a selo) in Uchpilinsky Selsoviet, Dyurtyulinsky District, Bashkortostan, Russia. The population was 223 as of 2010. There are 4 streets.

Geography 
Kazaklarovo is located 18 km northeast of Dyurtyuli (the district's administrative centre) by road. Staroyantuzovo is the nearest rural locality.

References 

Rural localities in Dyurtyulinsky District